Vișani is a commune in Brăila County, Muntenia, Romania. It is composed of three villages: Câineni-Băi, Plăsoiu and Vișani.

References

Communes in Brăila County
Localities in Muntenia